West Lealman is a census-designated place (CDP) in Pinellas County, Florida, United States. The population was 15,651 at the 2010 census. Prior to 2010, West Lealman was part of a larger CDP named West and East Lealman.

Geography
West Lealman is located at  (27.8200, -82.7381). The community is bordered by the city of Pinellas Park to the northeast, St. Petersburg to the south, and by the town of Kenneth City to the east. Long Bayou and Cross Bayou border the CDP to the west, with the city of Seminole on the opposite shore of Cross Bayou.

Demographics

References

Unincorporated communities in Pinellas County, Florida
Census-designated places in Pinellas County, Florida
Census-designated places in Florida
Unincorporated communities in Florida